Paranotoreas zopyra  is a species of moth in the family Geometridae. This species is endemic to New Zealand. This species was first described by Edward Meyrick in 1883 and named Pasithea zopyra. In 1986 Robin C. Craw placed this species within the genus Paranotoreas.

References 

Larentiinae
Moths of New Zealand
Endemic fauna of New Zealand
Moths described in 1883
Taxa named by Edward Meyrick
Endemic moths of New Zealand